Lily Leung Shun-Yin (7 January 1929 – 13 August 2019) was a Hong Kong actress.

Born in Hong Kong Leung attended Belilios Public School.

Career 
Leung started her acting career in 1957. Leung appeared for Rediffusion Television (1957 to 1968 then from 1976 to 1982), ATV (1983 to 1988) as well as TVB (1968 to 1975 and again from 1989 to 2017). In 1988 she appeared in Bloodsport as Mrs Tanaka. Her husband was at risk for heart disease, and she publicly supported organizations working to cure it. Leung is credited with over 15 films.

Filmography

Films 
 1974 Everyday Is Sunday
 1975 The Happy Trio - Kiu's pose instructor
 1975 No End of Surprises
 1976 The Private Eyes - Mrs. Chu
 1981 Wedding Bells, Wedding Belles - Mrs. Fa 
 1988 Bloodsport - Mrs. Tanaka

Television series

Personal life 
On 13 August 2019, Leung died of cancer in the Hong Kong Buddhist Hospital in Hong Kong. She was 90 years old.

References

External links

 Lily Leung at allmovie.com
 Lily Leung at jaynestars.com

TVB veteran actors
Hong Kong television actresses
1929 births
2019 deaths
20th-century Hong Kong actresses
21st-century Hong Kong actresses